The Nikki Catsouras photographs controversy concerns the leaked photographs of Nicole "Nikki" Catsouras (March 4, 1988 – October 31, 2006), who died at the age of 18 in a high speed car crash after losing control of her father's Porsche 911 Carrera and colliding with a toll booth in Lake Forest, California. Photographs of Catsouras' badly disfigured body were published on the internet, leading her family to take legal action for the distress this caused.

Background

Circumstances of the accident 
On October 31, 2006, Catsouras and her parents ate lunch together at the family home in Ladera Ranch, California. Afterward, her father, Christos Catsouras, left for work while her mother Lesli remained at home. Around 10 minutes later, her mother saw Catsouras reversing out of the driveway in Christos' Porsche 911 Carrera, which she was not permitted to drive. Lesli called her husband and he began driving around trying to find his daughter. While doing so, he called 9-1-1, apparently minutes before the accident, and was put on hold. When he was taken off hold the dispatcher informed him of the accident.

Accident 
The Porsche crossed the road's broad median, which lacks a physical barrier on that segment, and crashed into an unmanned concrete toll booth near the Alton Parkway interchange. Catsouras was killed on impact. Toxicological tests revealed traces of cocaine in Catsouras' body, but no alcohol.

Leaked photographs 

According to Newsweek, the Catsouras "accident was so gruesome the coroner wouldn't allow her parents to identify their daughter's body". Photographs of the scene were taken by California Highway Patrol (CHP) officers as part of standard fatal traffic collision procedures. These photographs were forwarded to colleagues and leaked onto the Internet.

Two CHP employees, Aaron Reich and Thomas O'Donnell, admitted to releasing the photographs in violation of CHP policy. O'Donnell stated in interviews that he only sent the photos to his own e-mail account for viewing at a later time, while Reich stated that he had forwarded the pictures to four other people. Catsouras' parents discovered the photographs posted online. The pictures had gained much attention, including a fake MySpace tribute website that contained links to the photographs.  People anonymously e-mailed copies of the photos to the Catsouras family with misleading subject headers, in one case captioning the photo sent to the father with the words "Woohoo Daddy! Hey daddy, I'm still alive." This led the Catsouras family to withdraw from Internet use and, concerned that their youngest daughter might be taunted with the photographs, to begin homeschooling her.

The online harassment aspects of the case were covered by Werner Herzog in his 2016 documentary Lo and Behold, Reveries of the Connected World.

Legal action by the family 

The Catsouras family sued the California Highway Patrol and the two dispatch supervisors responsible for leaking the photographs in the Superior Court of California for Orange County. Initially, a judge ruled that it would be appropriate to move forward with the family's legal case against the CHP for leaking the photographs.

An internal investigation led the CHP to issue a formal apology and take action to prevent similar occurrences in the future, after discovering that departmental policy had been violated by the two dispatch supervisors.  O'Donnell was suspended for 25 days without pay, and Reich quit soon after, "for unrelated reasons", according to his lawyer. When the defendants moved for summary judgment, Judge Steven L. Perk dismissed the case against the Department of the California Highway Patrol after both Reich and O'Donnell were removed as defendants. Judge Perk ruled that the two were not under any responsibility for protecting the privacy of the Catsouras family, effectively ending the basis for the case. The superior court judge who dismissed the case ruled in March 2008 that while the dispatchers' conduct was "utterly reprehensible", there was no law that allowed it to be punishable.

The CHP sent websites "cease and desist" notices in an effort to get the photos off the Internet. The Catsouras family hired ReputationDefender to help remove the photos, to little avail. The organization estimated it had persuaded websites to remove 2,500 instances of the photos, but conceded that complete removal from the internet would be impossible. Attorney and blogger Ted Frank wrote that even though the media were sympathetic to the parents' plight, "the Streisand effect has resulted in far more dissemination of the gruesome photos".

On February 1, 2010, it was reported that the California Court of Appeal for the Fourth District had reversed Judge Perk's grant of summary judgment, and instead ruled that the Catsouras family did have the right to sue the defendants for negligence and intentional infliction of emotional distress. Calling the actions of O'Donnell and Reich "vulgar" and "morally deficient", the court stated:

We rely upon the CHP to protect and serve the public. It is antithetical to that expectation for the CHP to inflict harm upon us by making the ravaged remains of our loved ones the subject of Internet sensationalism ... O'Donnell and Reich owed the plaintiffs a duty not to exploit CHP-acquired evidence in such a manner as to place them at foreseeable risk of grave emotional distress.Court: CHP Officers Who Put Teen's Decapitation Photos on Internet Were "Vulgar" and "Morally Deficient", OC Weekly February 1, 2010. . Retrieved February 2, 2010.

On May 25, 2011, the California Court of Appeal for the Fourth District ruled that Aaron Reich failed to prove that e-mailing the photographs is covered by the First Amendment. Reich claimed that he e-mailed the photographs as a caution about the dangers of drunk driving because he e-mailed the pictures with an anti-drunk driving message, despite Catsouras' postmortem examination revealing a blood alcohol content of zero. The three-justice panel that reviewed Reich's appeal wrote, "Any editorial comments that Reich may have made with respect to the photographs are not before us. In short, there is no evidence at this point that the e-mails were sent to communicate on the topic of drunk driving." The justices questioned whether the recipients still retained the e-mails, but Reich's attorney conceded that they had not investigated this.

On January 30, 2012, the CHP reached a settlement with the Catsouras family, under which the family received around $2.37 million in damages. CHP spokeswoman Fran Clader commented: "No amount of money can compensate for the pain the Catsouras family has suffered. We have reached a resolution with the family to save substantial costs of continued litigation and a jury trial. It is our hope that with this legal issue resolved, the Catsouras family can receive some closure."

See also
Suicide of Ronnie McNutt
Murders of Bibaa Henry and Nicole Smallman

References

External links 

 Catsouras family wins right to sue over death photos

2006 in California
2006 controversies in the United States
21st century in photography
California Highway Patrol
History of women in California
Lake Forest, California
Obscenity controversies in photography
Privacy controversies and disputes
Road incident deaths in California